George Geldorp, Georg Geldorp or Jorge Geldorp (1580/1595, Cologne – 4 November 1665, London) was a Flemish painter who was mainly active in England where he was known for his portraits and history paintings. He was also active as an art dealer and impresario.

Life
Geldorp was the son of the Flemish portrait painter Gortzius Geldorp who lived and worked in Cologne. Geldorp first trained and worked as a painter in Cologne before being admitted as a Master in the Guild of Saint Luke in Antwerp in 1610. Two years later his first wife Margriet Parmentiers died in Antwerp.

In 1623, Geldorp moved to London where he painted a number of portraits in the Anglo-Netherlandish style, notably of William Cecil, 2nd Earl of Salisbury and his wife Catherine in 1626 (Hatfield House, Hertfordshire) and of Sir Arthur Ingram in late 1638/early 1639.

He was involved in organizing commissions in England for Flemish and Dutch artists including Rubens, Anthony van Dyck and Peter Lely.  Upon the Restoration, he assisted with the reconstitution of the art collection and possessions of the English Royal family and was rewarded for his services with the post of picture mender and cleaner to the King.

He was the teacher of Isaac Sailmaker.

Geldorp rented a house in Orchard Street from Lawrence Swettnam between 1643 and 1649. He undertook to paint for Swettnam "two good picture to life yearly". The Westminster house was previously occupied by the painters Alexander Keirincx and Cornelis van Poelenburgh.

Work
George Geldorp was a portrait specialist.  His portraits are regarded as less accomplished and more stiffly articulated than those of contemporary painters active in London such as Daniel Mijtens.  The surfaces of his paintings are decorative. The background of the Portrait of William Cecil, 2nd Earl of Salisbury contains an historically important view of Hatfield House with sportsmen in the foreground.

Geldorp was also active as a collaborator and copyist of Anthony van Dyck and later Peter Lely.

The Dutch biographer Arnold Houbraken reported that Geldorp was known to the artist biographer Joachim von Sandrart.  Von Sandrart had written that Geldorp was not a very accomplished draughtsman and had the habit of tracing other's sketches, and then pricking holes in these sketches, and sponging this onto the canvas as a guide to paint his subjects. Houbraken disapproved of this practise and wrote that he preferred to write about painters who were good draughtsmen.

References

External links

1580s births
1665 deaths
Flemish Baroque painters
Flemish portrait painters
Flemish history painters
Flemish art dealers
Painters from Antwerp
Surveyors of the Queen's Pictures
Artists from Cologne
German people of Belgian descent
Belgian expatriates in England